"Groovy" is a song recorded by South Korean boy group Cravity for their fifth extended play "Master: Piece." It was released as the album's lead single by Starship Entertainment on March 6, 2023.

Background and release
On February 10, 2023, Starship Entertainment announced that Cravity would be releasing their fifth extended play, Master: Piece, on March 6. On February 24, the track listing was released, with "Groovy" announced as the lead single. On March 4, the music video teaser was released. The song was released alongside its music video and the extended play on March 6.

Composition
Musically, 'Groovy' is a song that stands out with the retro pop and hip-hop sensibility of the 2000s, and contains Cravity's unique atmosphere and energy.

Commercial performance
"Groovy" debuted at number 132 on South Korea's Circle Digital Chart in the chart issue dated March 5–11, 2023; and number five on the Circle Download Chart.

Music video
The music video, directed by Bart (FLIPEVIL), was released alongside the song by Starship Entertainment on March 6, 2023. The accompanying music video shows both sides of Cravity as the guys go from suit-and-tie office workers to colorfully dressed pop stars onstage and at press conferences that the paparazzi are fighting to film. The different worlds continuously mix throughout the visual until the final chorus, when the boys dance in vibrant, chic, contemporary suits.

Promotion
Following the release of "Master: Piece", on March 6, 2023, Cravity held a live promotion through YouTube channel "Zanmang Loopy," entitled "CRAVITY COMEBACK SHOW in Jean Mang House." The group interacted and introduce the new album including "Groovy" through real-time communication with fans.

The group subsequently performed on two music programs in the first week: Mnet's M Countdown on March 9, and on MBC's Show! Music Core on March 11. Cravity also performed "Groovy" on entertainment program "Weekly Idol" before capping off the first week of promotions through a performance on "Sunmi's Show! Interview."

Credits and personnel
Credits adapted from Bugs!.

 Cravity – vocals
 Hwang Yu-bin – lyrics
 12h51m (VERYGOODS) – lyrics
 Lee Hyo-jung (VERYGOOD) – lyrics
 Serim – lyrics
 Allen – lyrics
 Cage – composition, arrangement
 Jimmy Claeson – composition

Charts

Weekly charts

Release history

References

Cravity songs
2023 singles
2023 songs
Korean-language songs
Starship Entertainment singles